The Feelin's Good is a compilation album of tracks recorded by jazz tenor saxophonist Hank Mobley during a single recording session in 1963. It was released on the Music Matters label. It features performances by Mobley, Donald Byrd, Herbie Hancock, Butch Warren and Philly Joe Jones.

The songs were originally released as follows: "Old World, New Imports" and "Up A Step", appeared on No Room for Squares released in 1964. "East Of The Village" and "The Good Life", appeared on The Turnaround! released in 1965 and the remaining two tracks, "The Feelin's Good" and "Yes Indeed", were not released until 1985 as part of the album Straight No Filter. In 2013, the company Music Matters released this compilation album.

Reception
Greg Simmons of All About Jazz praised the album as one of Mobley's best.

Track listing 
All compositions by Hank Mobley, except as noted

 "The Feelin's Good" 
 "Up A Step"
 "The Good Life" (Sacha Distel, Jack Reardon)
 "East of the Village" 
 "Yes Indeed" (Sy Oliver)
 "Old World, New Imports"

Personnel 
 Hank Mobley – tenor saxophone
 Donald Byrd – trumpet 
 Herbie Hancock – piano
 Butch Warren –  bass
 Philly Joe Jones – drums

References 

2013 albums
Albums produced by Alfred Lion
Blue Note Records albums
Hank Mobley albums
Albums recorded at Van Gelder Studio